South Market Street Historic District is a national historic district located at Petersburg, Virginia. The district includes 15 contributing buildings and 1 contributing object located in a predominantly residential section of Petersburg. It includes a varied collection of mid- to late-19th-century houses and includes notable examples of Late Victorian and Colonial Revival style architecture.  Notable buildings include the Mt. Olivet Baptist Church (1858), Scott House (1855), and Williams House (1879).  Located in the district and separately listed is the Thomas Wallace House.

It was listed on the National Register of Historic Places in 1992.

References

External links
Albert L. Scott House, 29 South Market Street, Petersburg, Petersburg, VA at the Historic American Buildings Survey (HABS)

Historic districts on the National Register of Historic Places in Virginia
Victorian architecture in Virginia
Colonial Revival architecture in Virginia
Buildings and structures in Petersburg, Virginia
National Register of Historic Places in Petersburg, Virginia
Historic American Buildings Survey in Virginia